Eva Birgitta Andersson-Dubin (born 1961) is a Swedish physician. She is also the founder of the Dubin Breast Center at the Tisch Cancer Institute at Mount Sinai Hospital in New York City. She is married to hedge fund billionaire Glenn Dubin. She worked as a model and won the Miss Sweden contest in 1980.

Education and medical career
Born in Sweden, she earned a high school diploma from Östraboskolan (Östrabo school) where she graduated first in her class, concentrating in mathematics and physics. After graduating, she pursued a career in modeling and in 1980 was named Miss Sweden and placed fourth runner up in the Miss Universe contest. She attended Karolinska Institutet in Stockholm for three and a half years and then transferred to UCLA's School of Medicine where she earned her MD in 1989. She then completed her residency in internal medicine at Lenox Hill Hospital in New York in 1990.

The Dubins donated approximately $19 million and were involved in raising an additional $24 million so that the center could open in 2011 and have funding to operate. Andersson-Dubin works at the Dubin Breast Center part of the Tisch Cancer Institute at Mount Sinai Hospital in New York City. Since opening in 2011 to 2018, the center has processed 180,000 patient visits.

Ford Modeling career
Gerard W. Ford, who founded and ran Ford Models with his wife Eileen Ford, discovered Eva Andersson while she was walking down the street in New York City. Jerry Ford took Eva Andersson to meet Eileen Ford and Andersson became a Ford Model. In the 1970s, Eileen Ford the American model agency executive and co-founder of Ford Models described Eva Andersson-Dubin's legs on her modeling card as: "excellent". Later, Eva Andersson was entered into the Miss Sweden contest without her knowledge, and won Miss Sweden 1980.

Personal life
Eva Andersson dated Jeffrey Epstein. Eva Andersson continued to "socialize with Epstein after his time in jail" for pleading guilty in 2008 to a state charge (one of two) of procuring for prostitution a girl below age 18.

In the early 1990s, Eva Andersson was seen by her future husband Glenn Dubin for the first time via a modeling photo in the New York Post's Page Six section.The couple has three children, Celina, Maya and Jordan.

References

External links
Unsealed Court documents from Giuffre v. Maxwell

Living people
Miss Sweden winners
Miss Universe 1980 contestants
People from Uddevalla Municipality
Swedish women physicians
Swedish emigrants to the United States
David Geffen School of Medicine at UCLA alumni
Year of birth missing (living people)
Jeffrey Epstein